The Passage, founded in 1980, runs London's largest voluntary sector day centre for homeless and vulnerable people helping over 200 people every day to access diverse services, including primary services (showers, access to clothes, etc.), housing and welfare advice, health services and employment and training services. The Passage have a supporting team of Street Link workers who make contact with those sleeping rough to see what can be done to help and have been running a 48-bed hostel, Passage House, since 1 March 2000. The Passage also run Montfort House, which contains 16 self-contained studio flats with on-site staff support for those preparing for independent living.

The Passage has been supported by numerous organisations and individuals including Cherie Blair, Sir Stuart Rose, Marks & Spencer, Hard Rock Café and 85FOUR.

For their 30th anniversary, The Passage and 85FOUR created an exhibition, THIRTY by THIRTY. The exhibition showcases 30 subjects such as Cherie Blair, Rory Bremner, Sir Stuart Rose, John Varley, Housing Minister Grant Shapps and Archbishop Vincent Nichols just to name a few – as well as a number of clients The Passage has helped to turn their lives around, colleagues, volunteers and supporters. 30 different photographers including Bob Wheeler, Alan Mahon, Paul Wenham-Clarke and Tom Hunter took images.

See also
John Studzinski

References

External links 
 The Passage Website

Homelessness charities in the United Kingdom
Charities based in London
Organizations established in 1980